Aliabad (also Romanized as ‘Alīābād) is a village in Khosrow Beyk Rural District, Milajerd District, Komijan County, Markazi Province, Iran. At the 2006 census, its population was 107, in 27 families.

References 

Populated places in Komijan County